Cui Wei (born 16 August 1994) is a Chinese footballer who currently plays as a midfielder for Meizhou Hakka.

Club career
Cui Wei started his football career when he played for China League Two side Shandong Youth in 2011 and 2012. In August 2013, he was loaned to Campeonato de Portugal side Loures for one season. Cui was promoted to Shandong Luneng's first team squad by Cuca in the 2015 season. On 4 May 2016, he made his debut for Shandong in the last group match of 2016 AFC Champions League against Buriram United with a 0–0 away draw, coming on as a substitution for Zhang Wenzhao in the 76th minute. Cui made his Super League debut on 4 March 2017 in a 2–0 home victory against Tianjin Teda as the benefit of the new rule of the Super League that at least one Under-23 player must in the starting. On 2 May 2017, he scored his first senior goal for the club in the 2017 Chinese FA Cup as Shandong Luneng beat League Two club Jilin Baijia 4–1. 

On 28 February 2018, Cui was loaned to China League One club Meizhou Hakka and would go on to make his debut in a league game on 18 March 2018 against Yanbian Funde in a 1-0 victory. He made a permanent transfer to Meizhou Hakka on 2 February 2019. He would then go on to be a vital member of the team that gained promotion to the top tier after coming second within the division at the end of the 2021 China League One campaign.

Career statistics 
Statistics accurate as of match played 31 December 2022.

References

External links
 

1994 births
Living people
Chinese footballers
Footballers from Shandong
Sportspeople from Zibo
Shandong Taishan F.C. players
GS Loures players
Meizhou Hakka F.C. players
China League Two players
China League One players
Chinese Super League players
Association football midfielders
Chinese expatriate footballers
Expatriate footballers in Portugal
Chinese expatriate sportspeople in Portugal